The 1997 LSU Tigers baseball team won a second consecutive NCAA championship at the College World Series, and the fourth overall for the school.  The 1997 team put on an impressive display of power, hitting an NCAA record 188 home runs, including one in each of the 70 games they played that season.

The Tigers were coached by Skip Bertman, who was in his 14th season as LSU head baseball coach.  LSU set a school record for victories, finishing with a 57–13 record, and won their second straight Southeastern Conference championship with a 22–7 overall mark.

Schedule/results

Statistical Leaders

References

Lsu
LSU Tigers baseball seasons
NCAA Division I Baseball Championship seasons
College World Series seasons
Southeastern Conference baseball champion seasons
LSU
LSU